John Dempsey may refer to:

Sports
 John Dempsey (footballer, born 1946), Republic of Ireland international football (soccer) player
 John Dempsey (footballer, born 1951), Tranmere Rovers player
 John Dempsey (umpire) (born 1965), New Zealand cricket umpire

Politicians
 John J. Dempsey (1879–1958), American politician, governor of New Mexico 
 John N. Dempsey (1915–1989), American politician, governor of Connecticut

Others
 John Dempsey (lyricist), also playwright
 John Dempsey (Medal of Honor) (1848–1884), American sailor and Medal of Honor recipient
 John Church Dempsey (1802–1877), English portrait artist

See also
Jack Dempsey (disambiguation)
John Dempsey Hoblitzell, American politician